Omphreoides is a genus of ground beetles in the family Carabidae. There are about six described species in Omphreoides, found in Madagascar.

Species
These six species belong to the genus Omphreoides:
 Omphreoides bispinus Fairmaire, 1896
 Omphreoides bucculentus Alluaud, 1899
 Omphreoides distinctus Alluaud, 1936
 Omphreoides furcatus Alluaud, 1897
 Omphreoides quodi Alluaud, 1910
 Omphreoides ranomafanae Kavanaugh & Rainio, 2016

References

Ctenodactylinae